Gigantidas coseli is a species of large, deepwater, hydrothermal vent mussel, a marine bivalve mollusc in the family Mytilidae, the mussels.  This species is endemic to the waters of the Bonin Islands of Japan.

References

 Science links info 

coseli
Molluscs described in 2010